Chocolate gravy is a variety of gravy made with fat, flour, cocoa powder, and varying amounts of sugar. This variety is more common in cuisine of the Southern United States and is most often served as a Sunday morning dish with fresh biscuits in the Ozark and Appalachian Mountain regions.

Milk is commonly used as the liquid in chocolate gravy, while some recipes use water. Some recipes devised in eastern Oklahoma use more sugar, and the fat comes from the use of butter after the gravy is complete, making it more like warm chocolate pudding served over biscuits. In a traditional gravy, a roux is made with fat and flour before the milk is added; in chocolate gravy all the dry ingredients are mixed first, milk slowly incorporated, then stirred continuously until cooked. When a thick and rich consistency is achieved, the butter and vanilla are added. Other ingredients, such as crumbled bacon, are usually added afterward near the end of preparation.

See also

 List of gravies

References

Brown sauces
Chocolate
Cuisine of the Southern United States